The Crocetta di Caltanissetta (translated as the Cross of Caltanissetta) is a traditional Italian sweet pastry that was produced in Caltanissetta, Sicily, until the end of 1908, then forgotten about, and which has recently been rediscovered. The Crocetta di Caltanissetta and the "Spina Sacra" (translated as Holy Thorn) are two pastry dishes that were traditionally prepared for the feast of the Most Holy Crucifix by the Sisters of the Benedictine Monastery. This monastery was located next to the Church of Santa Croce (Holy Cross), from which these sweet pastries take their name. 

The pastry chef who rediscovered them (plus four women from the Santa Croce district) are the only ones who know the recipe for these pastries.
The rediscovery was possible after 20 years of research that began with a person living in the neighbourhood who remembered how the traditional recipe was passed from mother to daughter over time.

Ingredients

The ingredients of the Croce di Caltanissetta are typical of the Caltanissetta area at the beginning of the last century. They are: almonds, sugar, sweet lemon purée, oranges or other fruit typical of the area, pistachio and icing sugar.  

The Crocetta is produced in two varieties. One is lemon flavored and coated with powdered sugar. The other is orange flavored with a sprinkle of pistachio on top.

See also
 List of desserts

References

External links
 

Cuisine of Sicily
Italian confectionery
Italian pastries